Mr Bloom's Nursery is an educational children's television program on BBC's brand CBeebies.  Mr Bloom, played by Ben Faulks, is a gardener who helps children to get involved and inspired by nature. Each episode sees a small group of children (whom he calls "tiddlers") visiting his allotment, feeding his "Compostarium" compost bin and interacting with puppet vegetables.

Series 1

Series 2

Series 3

External links

BBC – CBeebies Grown-ups – Mr Bloom's Nursery
BBC feature
Guardian coverage

British preschool education television series
British television shows featuring puppetry
2010s British children's television series
2010s preschool education television series
CBeebies
Television series about children
Television series by BBC Studios
English-language television shows